Knopkirie is a genus of mites in the Phytoseiidae family.

Species
 Knopkirie banksiae (McMurtry & Schicha, 1987)
 Knopkirie patriciae Beard, 2001
 Knopkirie petri Beard, 2001
 Knopkirie volutus Beard, 2001

References

Phytoseiidae